Liurana xizangensis is a species of frog in the family Ceratobatrachidae. It is endemic to Tibet (=Xizang in Chinese), China, and only known from the region of its type locality, Yi'ong, in Bomê County. It is also known as Xizang eastern frog and Xizang papillae-tongued frog.

Description
The tympanum is large and distinct. Skin is dorsally smooth but with scattered tubercles, while the belly is granular. The finger and toe tips are not swollen. No webbing is present. The dorsum is brown with a black inter-ocular stripe. The belly is pale yellow with black, reticulated markings.

Habitat and conservation
They live in humid habitats, typically hiding under mossy rocks. There are no known threats to this poorly-known species, but its population size is believed to be small. The known range does not include any protected areas. However, its actual range might be wider than currently known.

References

xizangensis
Frogs of China
Endemic fauna of Tibet
Taxonomy articles created by Polbot
Amphibians described in 1977